The San-São is the name of the Santos Futebol Clube and São Paulo Futebol Clube, contested between two of the most successful clubs in Brazilian football. Because of the historical success of the two clubs, it is considered one of the biggest derbies in the state of São Paulo.

Statistics

Source: Futpedia

General
319 Matches
107 Wins – Santos
137 Wins – São Paulo
75 Draws
Santos goals: 454
São Paulo goals: 527
Last Match: Santos 1–0 São Paulo (Campeonato Brasileiro, 21 August 2022)

Campeonato Brasileiro
Includes Torneio Roberto Gomes Pedrosa
74 Matches
28 Wins – Santos
30 Wins – São Paulo
17 Draws
Santos goals: 100
São Paulo goals: 95
Last Match: Santos 1–0 São Paulo (Campeonato Brasileiro, 21 August 2022)

Copa do Brasil
2 Matches
2 Wins – Santos
0 Wins – São Paulo
0 Draw
Santos goals: 6
São Paulo goals: 2
Last Match: Santos 3–1 São Paulo (28 October 2015)

Other
Largest victories:
São Paulo 6–1 Santos (3 June 1993)
São Paulo 4–0 Santos (6 March 2021)
São Paulo 0–4 Santos (30 June 2006)
Santos 4–1 São Paulo (28 January 1979)
Santos 0–3 São Paulo (20 May 2022)
Santos 3–0 São Paulo (9 September 2015)
Santos 3–0 São Paulo (2 October 2013)
Santos 0–3 São Paulo (3 July 1977)

Titles comparison

 Note (1): Although the Intercontinental Cup and the FIFA Club World Cup are officially different tournaments, in Brazil they are treated many times as the same tournament.

References

External links
 Futpédia

Brazilian football derbies
Santos FC
São Paulo FC
1930 establishments in Brazil
Recurring sporting events established in 1930